Niebieszczany  (Nebeshchany) is a village in the administrative district of Gmina Sanok, within Sanok County, Subcarpathian Voivodeship, in south-eastern Poland.

The village has a population of 2,100.

18 February 1846 - beginning of the Galician peasant revolt.

References

Niebieszczany